The Guizhou Provincial Library, also known as the Guizhou Library, is a Guiyang-based comprehensive provincial-level public library, located on Beijing Road in Guiyang City, Guizhou Province.

History
The predecessor of the Guizhou Provincial Library was the Guizhou Province-established Library,  which was founded in May 1937. 

On 31 December 2020, the Guizhou Provincial Library (North Hall) opened for trial operation,  which is the New Hall of Guizhou Provincial Library.

References

Libraries in China
Buildings and structures in Guiyang
Libraries established in 1937